Eren Karadağ (born 1 January 2000) is a Turkish professional footballer who plays as a winger for TFF Second League club Düzcespor on loan from Çaykur Rizespor.

Professional career
A youth product for Çaykur Rizespor since 2011, he signed a professional contract with them in 2018 and began his senior career with successive loans with Esenler Erokspor and Pazarspor. He made his professional debut for Çaykur Rizespor in a 3–0 Süper Lig loss to Beşiktaş on 13 August 2021.

International career
Karadağ represented the Turkey U23s in their winning campaign at the 2021 Islamic Solidarity Games.

Honours
Turkey U23
Islamic Solidarity Games: 2021

References

External links
 
 
 

2000 births
Sportspeople from Rize
Living people
Turkish footballers
Turkey youth international footballers
Association football wingers
Çaykur Rizespor footballers
Pazarspor footballers
Adanaspor footballers
Süper Lig players
TFF First League players
TFF Second League players
TFF Third League players